= Pimrypie =

Thai YouTuber

YouTube information
- Channel: @PimrypieOfficial
- Years active: 2012–present
- Genres: Charity, selling

Pimrada Benjawattana (born October 9, 1990), better known as Pimrypie (Thai: พิมรี่พาย), is a mother of two. She is a popular Thai YouTuber specializing in online sales, and is also an artist and executive at High Claus Entertainment. She is particularly well-known for her charitable work in Omkoi District, Chiang Mai Province, on January 9, 2021, by installing solar panels for the benefit of the local community.

== History and work ==
Her father is from Chumphon province, and her mother is from Nakhon Si Thammarat province. She grew up in Bangkok. Because her family was involved in commerce, she absorbed these skills and began her entrepreneurial journey by selling online under the name "Pimrypie Sells Everything," a business she has continued ever since.

In February 2021, she took on a major role by launching her own record label business called Hein Klaus Entertainment with Fucking Hero and Louis Thana, and she herself is an artist under the label as well as a record label executive. She released a song called Ya Na Ka, which is her own single.

== Charity ==
On January 9, 2021, she helped children and underprivileged people in Omkoi District, Chiang Mai Province by providing consumer goods, as well as installing solar panels and giving televisions to schools in the area because the people in the area lack access to electricity and amenities. This received a wave of praise from social media and the general public until "#Pimrypie" became the number one trending topic on Twitter on that day. However, there was a wave of criticism from another group of people that what she did was a publicity stunt. Assoc. Prof. Pinkaew Lueangoramsri said that what she did not know the real problems in the area and was only a charity for the lower class. She later clarified through a live broadcast on Facebook on January 11, 2021 that she intended to help people in the area with sincerity and without expecting any return. Later, the Revenue Department investigated her income tax from her online business. After the news of the charity, it was found that the live broadcast through Her continuous stream in one hour resulted in 16,300 orders and reached 6 million viewers. In May 2021, she stated that she was affected by Thaksin Shinawatra's remarks about her and thought that her name was being used to "criticize the government." This led to Warong Dejkitwikrom later praising her for daring to retaliate against Thaksin.

== Litigation ==
In August 2019, police from the Consumer Protection Division inspected her home and found imported perfumes without Thai Food and Drug Administration registration numbers. She defended herself by saying she had actually done it, but had stopped.
